The Canada Cup (branded as the Home Hardware Canada Cup for sponsorship reasons, and also referred to as the Canada Cup of Curling) is a major men's and women's curling championship in Canada. It is organized by Curling Canada and is one of its major events on its "Season of Champions". The event is frequently used as a qualifier for various other events, such as the Canadian Olympic Curling Trials, Pre-Trials and Continental Cup. Since 2013, the Canada Cup is not held during the same curling season as the Winter Olympic Games.

Competition history
The first event was held in 2003 at the Sport Mart Place in Kamloops, British Columbia, the Cup's home until 2008. During this time the event was sponsored by the Strauss Herb Company. The first event featured a total purse of $220,000, divided equally for the men's and women's events. Subsequent events however have seen smaller purses available.

In 2004, a second tier of competition, the qualification rounds Canada Cup East and Canada Cup West were added. In 2006, this had changed to men's and women's qualification rounds. The qualifying rounds were held every year with the John Shea Insurance Canada Cup Qualifier being held at the Ottawa and Rideau curling clubs in Ottawa, Ontario and the Diversified Transportation Canada Cup Qualifier being held at the Saville Sports Centre in Edmonton, Alberta. The men's and women's qualifiers alternated between the two cities.

On February 18, 2008, the Canadian Curling Association announced that the 2009 finals of the Canada Cup of Curling would be held at the Farrell Agencies Arena in Yorkton, Saskatchewan.

The 2009-10 season was without a Canada Cup, with the event returning in December 2010 rather in the Spring like it had been previously. The Canada Cup qualifiers were abolished for the 2010 event, using a number of smaller bonspiels to feed the event. The 2010 event was held at the Medicine Hat Arena in Medicine Hat, Alberta.

The 2011 event in Cranbrook, British Columbia hosted seven teams of each gender instead of ten. The teams played in a round robin as in previous years, with the top three advancing to the playoff round. The second and third-placed teams played in the semifinal, and the winner faced the first-placed team in the final.  The 2012 event used the same format.

At present, there are no longer any qualifying tournaments. Teams qualify based on their World Curling Tour Order of Merit rankings, with one spot reserved for the top-ranking non-qualified team on the Canadian Team Ranking System closer to the event.

Due to the COVID-19 pandemic in Canada, Curling Canada stated that the 2020 Canada Cup would likely be postponed to an unspecified date in 2021, citing its role in qualification for trials for the 2022 Winter Olympics. The 2021 event ultimately did not go ahead, and there are no plans to hold the event in the near future.

Winners

Men

Women

References

External links
Event history

 
Curling competitions in Canada